Major General David Dixon Porter (April 29, 1877 – February 25, 1944), a Medal of Honor recipient, was a United States Marine Corps officer who served in the Philippine–American War and in World War I.

Biography
He was the son of Lieutenant Colonel Carlile Patterson Porter (1846–1914), USMC, grandson of Admiral David Dixon Porter (1813–1891), and great-grandson of Commodore David Porter (1780–1843).

Captain Porter received the Medal of Honor during the Philippine–American War for efforts in battle at the junction of the Cadacan and Sohoton Rivers, Samar on November 17, 1901.  He was also one of the officers who participated in Waller's march across Samar.

Upon his retirement from the Marine Corps, Porter was promoted to major general on the retired list.

He was one of only three individuals to be awarded both the Medal of Honor and the Brevet Medal.

He was buried at Arlington National Cemetery, in Arlington, Virginia.

Awards
 Medal of Honor
 Marine Corps Brevet Medal
 Spanish Campaign Medal
 Philippine Campaign Medal
 World War I Victory Medal

Medal of Honor citation
For extraordinary heroism and eminent and conspicuous conduct in battle at the junction of the Cadacan and Sohoton Rivers, Samar, P. I., November 17, 1901.

Citation:

In command of the columns upon their uniting ashore in the Sohoton Region, Col. Porter (then Capt.) made a surprise attack on the fortified cliffs and completely routed the enemy, killing 30 and capturing and destroying the powder magazine, 40 lantacas (guns), rice, food and cuartels. Due to his courage, intelligence, discrimination and zeal, he successfully led his men up the cliffs by means of bamboo ladders to a height of 200 feet. The cliffs were of soft stone of volcanic origin, in the nature of pumice and were honeycombed with caves. Tons of rocks were suspended in platforms held in position by vines and cables (known as bejuco) in readiness to be precipitated upon people below. After driving the insurgents from their position which was almost impregnable, being covered with numerous trails lined with poisoned spears, pits, etc., Col. Porter led his men across the river, scaled the cliffs on the opposite side, and destroyed the camps there. He and the men under his command overcame incredible difficulties and dangers in destroying positions which, according to reports from old prisoners, had taken 3 years to perfect, were held as a final rallying post, and were never before penetrated by white troops. Col. Porter also rendered distinguished public service in the presence of the enemy at Quinapundan River, Samar, Philippine Islands, on 26 October 1901.

Marine Corps Brevet Medal citation
Citation

The Secretary of the Navy takes pleasure in transmitting to First Lieutenant David Dixon Porter, United States Marine Corps, the Brevet Medal which is awarded in accordance with Marine Corps Order No. 26 (1921), for distinguished conduct and public service in the presence of the enemy while serving with the Second Battalion of Marines, at Novaleta, Philippine Islands, on 8 October 1899. On 28 March 1901, First Lieutenant Porter is appointed Captain, by brevet, to rank from 8 October 1899.

See also

 List of Medal of Honor recipients
 Littleton W. T. Waller

References

General
 
 
 
 
 

Specific

External links
 

1877 births
1944 deaths
American military personnel of the Philippine–American War
United States Marine Corps personnel of World War I
Burials at Arlington National Cemetery
Military personnel from Washington, D.C.
Philippine–American War recipients of the Medal of Honor
United States Marine Corps generals
United States Marine Corps Medal of Honor recipients